Miss Polonia 2017 was the 40th Miss Polonia pageant, held on 26 November 2017. The winner was Agata Biernat of Łódź and she represented Poland in Miss World 2018 at Sanya. 1st Runner-Up Magdalena Swat represented Poland at Miss Universe 2018. 2nd Runner-Up Malwina Ratajczyk presented the country at Miss Grand International 2018.

Final results

Special Awards

Official Delegates

Notes

Returns
Last competed in 2011:
 Holy Cross
 Lower Silesia
 Lubusz

Last competed in 2012:
 West Pomerania

Withdrawals
 Kuyavia-Pomerania
 Lower Poland
 Podlasie

Did not compete
 Opole
 Subcarpathia
 Upper Poland
 Polish Community in Argentina
 Polish Community in Australia
 Polish Community in Belarus
 Polish Community in Brazil
 Polish Community in Canada
 Polish Community in France
 Polish Community in Germany
 Polish Community in Ireland
 Polish Community in Israel
 Polish Community in Lithuania
 Polish Community in Russia
 Polish Community in South Africa
 Polish Community in Sweden
 Polish Community in the U.K.
 Polish Community in the U.S.
 Polish Community in Venezuela

References

External links
Official Website

2017
2017 beauty pageants
2017 in Poland